Balrog is a fictional character in Capcom's Street Fighter series. He made his first appearance in Street Fighter II: The World Warrior in 1991. In the series, he is a disgraced boxer and antagonist who works for M. Bison's organization, Shadaloo.

Conception and development
Balrog is depicted as an African-American boxer wearing blue trunks with white trim and a torn white shirt under a blue tank top, wearing red boxing gloves and boxing shoes. In Japan, the character of Balrog is named M. Bison (with the letter being an initial for "Mike") after real-life boxer Mike Tyson. However, when the developers of Street Fighter II were working on the overseas versions, they rotated the names of three of the boss characters for the English localization, fearing that naming the boxer character "Mike Bison" might be a legal liability. Ironically, years later, Mike Tyson revealed that he was unaware of the character, but was honoured by the homage. At , Balrog is a tall, massive, heavy built fighter in the Street Fighter series. Balrog is simply known as Boxer for international tournaments.

Although recognized as a separate character, Mike is considered to be a prototype of Balrog due to their similar names (when one considers Balrogs Japanese name of Mike Bison) and gameplay.

Appearances

In video games
Balrog appears in Street Fighter II as the first of four CPU-controlled opponents at the end of the single-player tournament. Balrog would become a playable character in subsequent revisions of the game, beginning with Street Fighter II: Champion Edition. Balrog is characterized as a belligerent street-raised boxer seeking the "American Dream" and one of the "Four Devas" (Shitennou, "Four Heavenly Kings") of Shadaloo.

His next major appearance was in Street Fighter Alpha 3. Balrog was a CPU-controlled sub-boss in the arcade version who faced only certain characters and was only playable after certain requirements were met, but also selectable as a playable character via secret code. He was made into a regular playable character in the arcade update and subsequent home versions and given his own in-game plot, home stage and endings. This incarnation of Balrog also appears in Capcom vs. SNK and Capcom vs. SNK 2. Balrog also appears in SNK vs. Capcom: SVC Chaos.

Balrog appears in Street Fighter IV and Super Street Fighter IV, once more serving Shadaloo in the hopes of making easy money. He appears in the crossover fighting game, Street Fighter X Tekken, with his official tag partner, Vega. Balrog reappears in Street Fighter V as one of the game's initial six DLC characters, released in July 2016.

Gameplay
As a boxer, Balrog generally does not fight with his feet. This makes him unique among the game's characters. Instead of possessing three punch attacks and three kick attacks like the rest of the cast, he has six punches, with the kick buttons generally (but not always) used for low blows while the punch buttons are used for high blows. He also has no projectile attacks, unlike many Street Fighter characters. Many of his special attacks, super combos and ultra combos consist of dash punches, some of which can pass through projectiles.

In other media
In the 1994 anime film Street Fighter II: The Animated Movie, Balrog is portrayed as one of Bison's three top men like in the Street Fighter II games, serving as a representative and informant for Bison during a drug deal in Las Vegas and ends up fighting against E. Honda during the final battle. Honda defeats him off-screen and later carries him to safety. He is presumably handed over to the authorities after Bison is defeated by Ryu and Ken. In battle, he wears dark green cargo pants instead of his boxing trunks, and lacks his boxing gloves. He is voiced by Jouji Nakata in the original Japanese version and Joe Romersa in the English dub.

In the 1994 live-action film version of Street Fighter, Balrog is portrayed by Grand L. Bush and is a supporting protagonist, more specifically the videographer in Chun-Li's news crew. Like the other members (Chun-Li and Honda), Balrog holds a grudge against the Shadaloo Tong, headed by Sagat, for ruining his boxing career, after apparently refusing to throw a match for them. Near the end of the film, he dons a purple variation of his regular outfit from the games and aids Guile, Chun-Li, Ryu and Ken in rescuing the hostages, and personally breaks the lock to the hostage chamber to free them. In the AN forces' files, he is listed as "Balrog, G"; the "G" could either stand as the first initial for Gerard (the middle name of Mike Tyson), or it could possibly be a homage to Grand L. Bush's first name. Balrog also appears in the arcade and home versions of the Street Fighter: The Movie game.

The 1995 anime series Street Fighter II V features a significantly altered depiction of Balrog where he is a Shadaloo spy who has infiltrated Interpol. Balrog hires Cammy to assassinate Chun-Lis father Dorai, under the false pretense that Dorai is the Shadaloo spy. Though Cammy carries out the assassination, Balrog later learns from his superiors that Dorai survived and Interpol are covering it up to lure the spy up. In a panic, Balrog demands that Cammy finish Dorai off, which leads to a fight between her and Fei-Long inside Dorai's hospital room, during which Cammy learns of Balrog's treachery. Balrog is later confronted by Cammy and he attempts to kill her, but with help from Fei-Long and the Interpol chief, he is subdued and arrested. Unlike in the games, Balrog never actually fights in the TV series and only appears in wearing boxing gear in concept art and during the show's second opening animation. He was voiced by Tomomichi Nishimura in Japanese, while Joe Romersa reprises his role from Street Fighter II: The Animated Movie for the English dub.

In the 1995 Street Fighter animated series, Balrog appears as a computer programmer working for Bison. He appears in one episode only ("Medium is the Message"), where he was voiced by Paul Dobson.

In the 2009 Street Fighter: The Legend of Chun-Li, Balrog is played by Michael Clarke Duncan. He serves as Bison's bodyguard, and a feared gangster. He is killed by Chun Li's mentor Gen.

Lincoln Blake played Balrog in the fan film Street Fighter: Enter the Dragon. In the fan film Balrog: Behind The Glory, Balrog's origin is elaborated on with the Mike Bison name his given name. He was played by Les Jennings.

Reception
Balrog was voted 18th in Capcom's own popularity poll of 85 characters for the 15th anniversary of Street Fighter. IGN ranked Balrog at number 15 in their list of top Street Fighter characters in 2008, noting his similarities to Tyson as well as his role as one of boxing's representatives in fighting games. In 2009, GameDaily named him one of gaming's greatest black characters, noting that while not the deepest character on the list, he had significant longevity as a Street Fighter series character and received praise for representing boxing in the game "alongside flashier martial arts". UGO ranked him as 12th on a list of top Street Fighter characters in 2010. GamesRadar wrote in a list of gaming's most satisfying uppercuts, "while it’s hardly Street Fighter’s most iconic or famous uppercut, the Dash Upper still packs a pretty nasty wallop." Bleacher Report listed Balrog as the 10th best fictional boxers, but criticized him by calling him "one of the worst video game bosses ever", citing that he could only punch.

On the other hand, Edge stated however Balrog "seems a little useless" in light of Dudley, a boxer introduced in Street Fighter III. In the official survey by Namco, Balrog was the fourth-least requested Street Fighter side character to be added to the roster of Tekken X Street Fighter.

References

General references

Inline citations

External links
 Balrog's Street Fighter II, Street Fighter Alpha, and Street Fighter IV entries at StrategyWiki.org

Action film characters
Action film villains
Capcom antagonists
Black characters in video games
Fictional African-American people
Fictional American people in video games
Fictional professional boxers
Fictional characters from Las Vegas
Fictional criminals in video games
Fictional gamblers
Fictional henchmen in video games
Fictional mercenaries in video games
Male characters in video games
Male video game villains
Street Fighter characters
Video game bosses
Video game characters based on real people
Video game characters introduced in 1991
Cultural depictions of Mike Tyson
Male film villains
Fictional boxers